Mieczysław Haiman also known as Miecislaus Haiman (31 March 1888 in Złoczów - 15 January 1949 in Chicago) was a Polish-American journalist and historian. He has been called "The most celebrated historian of American Polonia in the twentieth century".

Since 1969 Polish American Historical Association gives out the Mieczysław Haiman Award (also known as the Miecislaus Haiman Award) "for sustained contribution to the study of Polish Americans".

References

Further reading 

 Polski Słownik Biograficzny t. 9, Wrocław-Warszawa-Kraków 1960–1961.
 Teresa Kaczorowska, Mieczysław Haiman (1888–1949) – działacz i historyk Polonii amerykańskiej; doctoral thesis; Akademia Humanistyczna im. Aleksandra Gieysztora, 2007.
 Teresa Kaczorowska, Mieczysław Haiman [1888–1949] – wskrzesiciel dumy Polonii [amerykańskiej], „Studia Polonijne” 25 (2004), p. 127–139.
 Teresa Kaczorowska, Mieczysław Haiman. Pierwszy historyk Polonii jako żeglarz. Sokół i poeta, „Przegląd Polonijny” 31 (2005), v. 2, p. 5–30.
 Andrzej Brożek, Haimann Mieczysław [w:] Słownik historyków polskich, red. Maria Prosińska-Jackl, Warszawa 1994, p. 172–173.
 Robert Szymczak, The Pioneer Days. Mieczysław Haiman and Polish American Historiography, "Polish American Studies" 50 (1993), no 1, p. 7–21.
 Korespondencja Władysława Konopczyńskiego z Mieczysławem Haimanem z lat 1931–1947, red. i oprac.Wiesław Bieńkowski, „Rocznik Biblioteki PAN w Krakowie” 44 (1999), p. 425–444.
 Tadeusz V. Gromada, Haiman and Halecki in light of the Polish Institute of Arts & Sciences of America Archives, "Polish American Studies" 63 (2006), no 2, p. 79–92.

1888 births
1949 deaths
Historians of Polish Americans
Officers of the Order of Polonia Restituta
Polish curators
American curators
20th-century Polish historians
Polish male non-fiction writers
20th-century American historians
American male non-fiction writers
Austro-Hungarian emigrants to the United States
Polish emigrants to the United States
People from Zolochiv, Lviv Oblast
Polish Austro-Hungarians
People from the Kingdom of Galicia and Lodomeria
20th-century American male writers